"Wherever You Are" is the fourth and final single released from Mic Geronimo's debut album, The Natural. Produced by Mark Sparks, "Wherever You Are" was the least successful of the album's four singles, peaking at 43 on the Hot Rap Singles. It was sampled in American electronica musician Moby's 2003 single "Jam for the Ladies".

Single track listing

A-Side
"Wherever You Are" (Radio Remix)
"Wherever You Are" (Album)
"Wherever You Are" (Remix Instrumental)

B-Side
"Men vs. Many" (Radio)
"Men vs. Many" (Instrumental)
"Wherever You Are" (Acapella)

Charts

1995 songs
1996 singles
Mic Geronimo songs
TVT Records singles